The Saint-Esprit ("Holy Ghost") was an 80-gun ship of the line of the French Navy, lead ship of her class.  She was funded by a don des vaisseaux donation from the Order of the Holy Spirit, and named in its honour.

Career 

She took part in the Battle of Ushant under La Motte-Picquet, and to the Armada of 1779.

In 1781, on 29 April, she took part in the Battle of Fort Royal under Chabert-Cogolin.

She was renamed Scipion in April 1794, and took part in the Bataille du 13 prairial an 2 under Huguet, where she was totally dismasted. She was wrecked on 30 January 1795, during the Croisière du Grand Hiver. Most of her crew were rescued by Trente-et-un Mai.

Notes and references

Notes

References

Bibliography 
 
 
 

Ships of the line of the French Navy
Saint-Esprit-class ships of the line
Shipwrecks in the Bay of Biscay
1765 ships
Maritime incidents in 1795
Don des vaisseaux